Boophis tampoka is a species of frogs in the family Mantellidae. It is endemic to Madagascar.

References

tampoka
Amphibians described in 2007
Endemic frogs of Madagascar